Schmaltz herring (Yiddish) is  herring caught just before spawning, when the fat (schmaltz) in the fish is at a maximum. Colloquially, schmaltz herring refers to this fish pickled in brine: see pickled herring.

References

External links 
 

Herring dishes
Food preservation
Ashkenazi Jewish cuisine
Shabbat food